This is a list of palaces in Bratislava, both historical and from the modern era.

Existing palaces

Panská Street
 Johann Pálffy Palace
 Keglevich Palace (Panská 27)
  (Panská)
  (Panská)
  (Panská 15)

Main Square
  (Hlavné námestie 7, Sedlárska 7)
 (Hlavné námestie 8)
  (Hlavné námestie)
  (Hlavné námestie 4)
  (Zelená, Hlavné námestie)

Ventúrska Street

  (Ventúrska 1)
 (Ventúrska 9)
 Pálffy Palace (Ventúrska 10)
  (Ventúrska 15)

Bratislava Castle (Podhradie)
 Royal Palace in Bratislava Castle 
  (Vydrica)

Hviezdoslavovo námestie
  (Hviezdoslavovo námestie 6)
  (Hviezdoslavovo námestie)
  (Hviezdoslavovo námestie 18)
  (Hviezdoslavovo námestie 12)

Ľudovíta Štúra Square
 Esterházy Palace (Námestie Ľudovíta Štúra)
 Dessewffyho Palace (Námestie Ľudovíta Štúra)
 Lanfranconiho Palace (Námestie Ľudovíta Štúra 1)

Gorkého Street
  (Gorkého 5, Laurinská 8)

Štefánikova Street
 Pistoriho Palace (Štefánikova 25)
 Karáčoniho Palace (Štefánikova 2)

SNP Square
  (SNP Square)
  (SNP Square)

Kapitulská Street
 Prepoštský Place (Kapitulská)
 Esterházy Palace (Kapitulská 6-8)

Michalská Street
   (Michalská 1)
 Jesenákov palác (Michalská 3)

Panenská Street
 Georgievitsov palác (Panenská 11)
 Habermayerov palác (Panenská 15)

Vajanského Embankment
 Jurenákov palác (Vajanského nábrežie 3)

Dunajská Street
 Viczayov palác (demolished)

Sienkiewiczova Street
 Palác Robotníckej poisťovne (Sienkiewiczova 1)

Hodžovo námestie

 Grassalkovich Palace (Hodžovo námestie 1)

Godrova Street
 Erdödyho palác (Godrova 2)

Františkánske Square

 Mirbach Palace (Františkánske námestie)

Pražská Street
 Palugyayov palác (Pražská)

Štúrova Street
 Čákiho palác (Štúrova)

Radničná Street
 Aponiho palác (Radničná 1)

Špitálska Street
 Aspremont Summer Palace(Špitálska 24)

Uršulínska
 Palác Ruttkayovcov Vrútockých (Uršulínska 6)

Slobody Square

 Episcopal Summer Palace (Námestie slobody 1)

Primaciálne Square

 Primate's Palace (Primaciálne námestie 2)

Krížna Street
 Ludwigov palác (Krížna)

Záhradnícka Street
 Justičný palác (Záhradnícka)

Demolished palaces
  
 
  
 
  (Summer wing only survives)
 

Palaces in Slovakia
 
Palaces in Bratislava
Bratislava